Philippe Wamba (June 3, 1971 – September 11, 2002) was an African-American editor and writer known for his fusion of African and African-American culture.

Early life
Wamba was born in California to Elaine Brown Wamba and Ernest Wamba dia Wamba, an American mother and a Congolese professor-turned-rebel father. He grew up in Boston, Dar es Salaam, and New Mexico. He studied at Harvard University as an undergraduate, then at Columbia University.

Career
Wamba worked on a variety of writing and publishing projects, culminating in his service as Editor-in-chief of the now defunct online magazine Africana.com. In 1999 he published a memoir entitled Kinship: A Family's Journey in Africa and America. Wamba was profiled in the New York Times Magazine and the book received some positive reviews.

Death
Wamba died in a car accident in Kenya while conducting research on African youth movements. The Harvard African Students Alumni Network announced plans to raise funds in his memory to promote traffic safety in Africa.Henry Louis Gates, a mentor who helped promote Wamba's memoir, said at his funeral, "Philippe lived on no man's hyphen."

References

1971 births
2002 deaths
American people of Democratic Republic of the Congo descent
Harvard University alumni
Columbia University Graduate School of Journalism alumni
Road incident deaths in Kenya
20th-century American memoirists
20th-century African-American writers
21st-century African-American people